The 2011 season was Pohang Steelers's twenty-ninth season in the K-League in South Korea. Pohang Steelers will be competing in K-League, League Cup and Korean FA Cup.

Players

Squad

Match results

K-League

League table

Results summary

Results by round

K-League Championship

Korean FA Cup

League Cup

Squad statistics

Appearances and goals
Statistics accurate as of match played 26 November 2011

Top scorers

Top assistors

Discipline

Transfer

In

Out

References

Pohang Steelers
Pohang Steelers seasons